Papaver nudicaule, the Iceland poppy, is a boreal flowering plant. Equivalence with Papaver croceum has been contested. Native to subpolar regions of Asia and North America, and the mountains of Central Asia as well as temperate China (but not in Iceland), Iceland poppies are hardy but short-lived perennials, often grown as biennials, that yield large, papery, bowl-shaped, lightly fragrant flowers supported by hairy,  curved stems among feathery blue-green foliage 1-6 inches long. They were first described by botanists in 1759. The wild species blooms in white or yellow, and is hardy from USDA Zones 3a-10b.

The Latin specific epithet nudicaule means “with bare stems”.

Cultivars  
Cultivars come in shades of yellow, orange, salmon, rose, pink, cream and white as well as bi-colored varieties. Seed strains include: ‘Champagne Bubbles’ (15-inch plants in orange, pink, scarlet, apricot, yellow, and creamy-white); ‘Wonderland’ (10-inch dwarf strain with flowers up to 4 inches wide); ‘Flamenco’ (pink shades, bordered white, 1½ to 2 feet tall); ‘Party Fun’ (to 1 foot, said to bloom reliably the first year in autumn and the second spring); ‘Illumination’ and ‘Meadow Pastels’ (to 2 feet, perhaps the tallest strains); ‘Matador’ (scarlet  flowers to 5 inches across on 16 inch plants); the perennial 'Victory Giants' with red petals and ‘Oregon Rainbows’, which has large selfed, bicolor, and picoteed flowers and is perhaps the best strain for the cool Pacific Northwest (elsewhere this strain’s buds frequently fail to open).

The dwarf Gartenzwerg group, and the cultivars ‘Solar Fire Orange’ and ‘Summer Breeze Orange’ have all won the Royal Horticultural Society’s Award of Garden Merit.

Cultivation

The plants prefer light, well-drained soil and full sun. The plants are not hardy in hot weather, perishing within a season in hot summer climates.

Iceland poppies, like all poppies, possess exceedingly minute seeds and long taproots that resent disturbance. In cool summer climates on well-drained soils, Iceland poppies can live 2-3 seasons, flowering from early spring to fall.

Iceland poppies are amongst the best poppies for cutting, as they last for several days in the vase.

Genetics
The genetics of the garden forms of P. nudicaule have been studied, particularly with respect to flower colour. The white flower colour is dominant with respect to yellow. Other colours, such as buff and orange, are recessive.

Toxicity
All parts of this plant are likely to be poisonous, containing (like all poppies) toxic alkaloids. In particular, P. nudicaule has been shown to contain the benzophenanthidine alkaloid, chelidonine. It also contains (+)-amurine, (-)-amurensinine, (-)-O-methylthalisopavine, (-)-flavinantine and (-)-amurensine.

References

nudicaule
Garden plants
Flora of Northern Europe
Flora of Northeast Asia
Flora of Subarctic America
Plants described in 1753
Taxa named by Carl Linnaeus